Robinson v. Shell Oil Company, 519 U.S. 337 (1997), is US labor law case in the United States Supreme Court in which the Court unanimously held that under federal law, U.S. employers must not engage in workplace discrimination such as writing bad job references, or otherwise retaliating against former employees as a punishment for filing job discrimination complaints.

Facts
The case involved a former Shell employee, Charles T. Robinson, who claimed Shell Oil Company fired him from his sales job because he is black. While his race discrimination lawsuit was pending, Robinson applied for a job with another company who contacted Shell seeking a reference. Shell gave Robinson an unfavourable rating and said it would not rehire him. The Equal Employment Opportunity Commission submitted a "friend of the court" brief, saying that if former employees were not protected, they "would be chilled from taking action to report or oppose discrimination." Under §704(a) of Title VII of the Civil Rights Act of 1964 it is unlawful "for an employer to discriminate against any of his employees or applicants for employment" who have availed themselves of Title VII's protections. The company claimed that because Robinson was now a former employee, because they fired him, he was no longer protected.

Judgment
The Court agreed with the view expressed by the EEOC. Thomas J wrote for the court, "EEOC quite persuasively maintains that it would be destructive to [the purposes of anti-bias law] for an employer to be able to retaliate with impunity."

Significance
Robinson eventually lost his original race discrimination case against Shell Oil Company.

See also
 List of United States Supreme Court cases
 Lists of United States Supreme Court cases by volume
 List of United States Supreme Court cases by the Rehnquist Court
 United States labor law

Notes

External links
 

United States employment discrimination case law
United States Supreme Court cases
United States Supreme Court cases of the Rehnquist Court
1997 in United States case law
Royal Dutch Shell litigation
United States racial discrimination case law